Museo Oliveriano is an archaeology museum in Pesaro, region of the Marche, Italy.

History
The museum occupies a former aristocratic residence, the Palazzo Almerici. It has a collection of Greek bronze statuettes, Ancient Roman art and artifacts, including sculpture, ceramics and coins. It also has objects excavated from the 7-8 AC (pre-Roman) burial at the necropolis of Novilara. These include portions of stelae inscribed in the North Picene language, and one depicting a sea battle with a Liburna. The museum also has a bronze tabula fabrorum. It has artifacts from the sacred grove of Lucus Pisaurensis and the pre-Roman Votive Stones of Pesaro.

The museum includes many Latin epitaphs. It also has a collection of post-Roman medallions. Adjacent to the museum is the Biblioteca Oliveriana, a library founded in the mid-18th century.

The idea of a public museum for these artifacts came from the scholar Giovanni Battista Passeri (1694-1780). Included in his collections were the findings of Annibale degli Abati Olivieri (1708-1789) at the Lucus Pisaurensis. In 1756, the Museo Archeologico Oliveriano was begun, but not opened to the public until 1793, displayed in the Palazzo Olivieri-Macchirelli. In 1885, the various collections in possession of the city were brought to this site.

References

Notes

Museums in Pesaro
Archaeological museums in Italy